The Goldberg win streak was a lengthy series of victories that established the character of American professional wrestler Goldberg, following his debut on WCW Monday Nitro on September 22, 1997. The unprecedented win streak proved to be essential in making Goldberg the breakout star of World Championship Wrestling (WCW), propelling the rookie wrestler to main event status within a year of his first match, and would become a tool used by other promotions to build young stars into main event players.

Background

Beginnings 

During the rehab following his NFL injury, Goldberg began powerlifting and mixed martial arts training. He was spotted by Lex Luger and Sting who urged him to try professional wrestling. Although not a fan of professional wrestling, he saw it as an alternative to his fledgling football career and began training at the WCW Power Plant.

Training under the tutelage of DeWayne Bruce, he made his debut as Bill Gold on a dark match at a Monday Nitro event on June 23, 1997 where he defeated Bruce (wrestling as Sgt. Buddy Lee Parker). He also faced and defeated Buddy Landell (Saturday Night dark match), Hugh Morrus (house show), Chip Minton (Nitro dark match) and John Betcha (house show). His final pre-televised appearance was in a dark match on July 24 at a Saturday Night taping in a loss to Chad Fortune.

The streak begins 

Now 5–1, Bill Goldberg had yet to be seen on television. As such, he was "undefeated" when he made his televised debut on Monday Nitro on September 22, 1997. Behind the scenes it was WCW announcer Mike Tenay who came up with the concept of the Goldberg Win Streak. Goldberg was booked to win over Morrus, and thus began a win streak that carried over onto WCW Saturday Night and non-televised house shows. The longer the streak became, the more popular the Goldberg character became.

After rampaging through most of WCW's undercard of wrestlers, Goldberg faced Raven on April 20 edition of Monday Nitro and captured the United States Heavyweight Championship. By June he had eclipsed 100 wins, and was getting over as a main eventer. Hulk Hogan eventually granted Goldberg a title match, which would take place on the July 6, 1998 episode of Nitro held at the Georgia Dome in Atlanta with over 40,000 in attendance, but Hogan insisted that Goldberg first had to defeat his nWo stablemate Scott Hall. Goldberg won and later in the evening was also able to defeat Hogan to become the WCW World Heavyweight Champion, in turn vacating his United States Heavyweight Championship.

Conclusion of the streak 

Now WCW Champion, Goldberg found himself the cornerstone of the company's efforts to stave off the WWF. The former number two promotion was now running neck and neck with WCW, and Goldberg was programmed into a feud with Diamond Dallas Page. At Halloween Havoc, the feud was settled after Goldberg defeated Page to retain the title. According to Goldberg, his match against Page was the favorite match of his career. Following technical issues with the PPV the match was aired for free on the following Monday Nitro; the huge rating that it garnered was the final time that Monday Nitro defeated Monday Night Raw.

As Goldberg moved on to a feud with The Giant, WCW management resorted to embellishing the win streak with fictional victories. Wrestling fans who followed match results online began to catch on as Goldberg's streak grew exponentially, and he began to incur the first backlash of his career.

At Starrcade, Goldberg's undefeated streak ended at an official approximate count of 173–0, and after 174 days as champion when he lost the title to Kevin Nash, after Scott Hall, disguised as a ringside security guard, made a run-in and shocked Goldberg with a taser gun.

List of matches

Aftermath 

Following the loss, Goldberg was booked against another wrestler who was enjoying an inflated win streak in Sid Vicious and challenged him to a match to end Sid's winning streak. The two feuded with each other, which culminated in a match at Halloween Havoc for Sid's U.S. Title. Goldberg defeated Sid via referee stoppage, and thus won his second United States Heavyweight Championship.

The following year the streak came up against when Goldberg feuded with Vince Russo, who gave him an ultimatum. If Goldberg was to lose another match at any point in time, unless he managed to duplicate his undefeated streak from 1997 to 1998, he would be forced to retire from professional wrestling. Goldberg defeated KroniK (Brian Adams and Bryan Clark) at Halloween Havoc in a handicap elimination match. He then started a feud with Lex Luger. This culminated in a match at Mayhem, which Goldberg won. They continued their rivalry and battled in a rematch at Starrcade. Goldberg won the match, but afterwards he was attacked by Luger's partner Buff Bagwell. Goldberg feuded with both Luger and Bagwell, who called themselves "Totally Buffed". His streak was broken at Sin when Goldberg, teaming with his Power Plant trainer DeWayne Bruce, lost to Totally Buffed in a tag team no disqualification match after a "fan" maced him, enabling Totally Buffed to pin him. The storyline was intended to enable Goldberg to have shoulder surgery, but WCW was sold to the WWF in March 2001, while Goldberg was still recuperating.

Validity of the streak 
Goldberg's win–loss record at WCW events from 1997 to 1998 differed from that which was perpetuated by the company, with the official figure exaggerating the number of matches in which he won to 173. Nick Schwartz of Fox Sports wrote: "No one really knows what Goldberg's actual record was... but it's generally accepted that 173–0 is an inflated number". Some of Goldberg's industry peers have stated that the figure was exaggerated. His then-WCW colleague Chris Jericho stated: "One week he'd be 42–0 and seven days later he'd be 58–0. Did stepping on bugs count?" Manager Jimmy Hart, who also worked with Goldberg in WCW, regarded the level of embellishment as "kind of funny", while professional wrestler The Miz said: "The number would just go on and on and on, to where it was like, 'Wait a second. How did he get this many wins in such a short time'?" This exaggeration damaged the streak's credibility among the WCW audience: upon noticing that the figure had been falsified, fans began to withdraw homemade signs trumpeting Goldberg's record.

While officially cited as 173–0, a definitive breakdown of all available match results shows that Goldberg began his career at an untelevised 5-1, and that following his debut he had an actual win streak of 156 consecutive victories with two that ended in No Contest before his Starrcade loss to Kevin Nash.

Legacy 

Although André the Giant was billed by the WWF as being undefeated for 15 years, the Goldberg Win Streak was the first lengthy televised win streak used to build a main eventer out of a new character. It is now part and parcel of the Hall of Fame legacy of the Goldberg character, and similar efforts were used to build the characters of Brock Lesnar in 2002, Ryback in 2012, and Asuka in 2017.

See also 
 The Streak, The Undertaker's win streak

References 

World Championship Wrestling
History of professional wrestling
Superlatives in sports
Records (superlatives)
Professional wrestling slang